Namatozodia is an extinct genus of prehistoric lungfish. The genus, and its sole species, Namatozodia pitikanta, are described in Kemp (1993). The only known example of the species and genus is a small skull found in the Arcadia Formation of the Crater, in Western Queensland, Australia. This is an early Triassic formation.

Discovery and naming
The holotype specimen, QM F15000, is a partial calvarium without associated tooth material found at the Crater, near Rolleston in western Queensland. 

The name Namatozodia is derived from the Greek namat-, or fountain, and zodiaion, a diminutive of animal. Pitikanta is an Aboriginal word for 'young' in a dialect local to the area the fossil was found.

Description

The known skull of Namatozodia is small, measuring only 7 millimeters by 3.5 millimeters, coming from an individual perhaps just 6 to 7 centimeters long, a size comparable to a juvenile Australian lungfish. However the skull bones are fully developed, apparently sutured and mineralized, and the individual was not necessarily juvenile.

See also

 Sarcopterygii
 List of sarcopterygians
 List of prehistoric bony fish

References 
 Kemp, A. (1993). Problematic Triassic dipnoans from Australia. In The Nonmarine Triassic: New Mexico Museum of Natural History and Science Bulletin, 3, 223–227. Lucas, S.G. and M. Morales, eds.

Prehistoric lobe-finned fish genera
Triassic fish